Tregonning is a hamlet is located to the north of Gummow's Shop in the civil parish of St Newlyn East in mid Cornwall, England, United Kingdom.

References

Hamlets in Cornwall
Farms in Cornwall